With the debut of the first professional baseball league, the National Association of Professional Base Ball Players, the Athletic Baseball Club of Philadelphia was one of the first clubs to join. The Athletics had been around since 1860 as an amateur club. Led by their captain and pitcher, Dick McBride, the team went 21–7 and won the first NA title during the 1871 season. Philadelphia's third baseman, Levi Meyerle, led the league with a .492 batting average.

Regular season

Season standings

Record vs. opponents

Roster

Player stats

Batting

Starters by position
Note: Pos = Position; G = Games played; AB = At bats; H = Hits; Avg. = Batting average; HR = Home runs; RBI = Runs batted in

Other batters
Note: G = Games played; AB = At bats; H = Hits; Avg. = Batting average; HR = Home runs; RBI = Runs batted in

Pitching

Starting pitchers
Note: G = Games pitched; IP = Innings pitched; W = Wins; L = Losses; ERA = Earned run average; SO = Strikeouts

Relief pitchers
Note: G = Games pitched; IP = Innings pitched; W = Wins; L = Losses; ERA = Earned run average; SO = Strikeouts

References
1871 Philadelphia Athletics season at Baseball Reference

Philadelphia Athletics (1860–1876) seasons
Philadelphia Athletics
Philadelphia Athletics season